Richie Mensah (born 17 May 1986), better known by his stage name Richie, is a Ghanaian singer-songwriter and record producer.  After producing records for several artists, Richie set up Lynx Entertainment record label and released his debut album All of Me on the label in 2008. He has since then gone on to win several awards both as a singer and record producer and is fast establishing himself as one of the biggest names in the Ghanaian music industry.

Early life
Richie was born in Accra, Ghana, and started performing at the age of six with his brother and sister at local variety shows.  He decided to embark on a career in music while studying science at Achimota Senior High School, Accra.  Richie graduated from Achimota Senior High School in 2003 and started producing records while studying computer software engineering at NIIT, Accra.

Music career

Establishing Lynx Entertainment
Richie set up Lynx Entertainment in 2006 and became the first artist signed to the record label. He went on to sign ASEM, OJ Blaq, Irene Logan, Eazzy, Zigi and MzVee as well as producing for and collaborating with Tinny, Okyeame Kwame, VIP, Praye, Bradez, Irene and Jane, Obour, Becca and several other big names in the Ghanaian music industry. He also worked on Originality the third album of Nigerian R&B star Faze.
The artistes on the record label have had critical and commercial success with songs such as "Frema", "Pigaro", "Runaway", "Wengeze", "No More Kpayor", "You Say Wey Tin" and "One Gal" with the label winning the "record label of the year" award at the Ghana Music Awards in 2009. 
In 2010, the artistes on the Lynx Entertainment record label Richie, ASEM, OJ Blaq, Eazzy and Zigi collaborated on Africa's Moment, which was featured on Hello Afrika, Sony Music's release in conjunction with the 2010 FIFA World Cup in South Africa. The song was also featured in the Vodafone advert that staged the first ever flashmob in West Africa. 
Lynx Entertainment released Back 2 Zero in July 2011. and featured hit singles "Yaaro", "Asa Fofro" featuring SK Blinks, "Ma Nim Ton" featuring Tinny and ‘Intoxicated’ featuring Sway which was nominated for "Hip Hop Song of the Year" at the 2011 Ghana Music Awards.  
In February 2012, Richie released "Changing Faces", the first single from his third album also titled Changing Faces.

Richie continues to nurture young talent and has established "Lynx School of Arts", a performing arts school in Ghana for talented people looking to enter the entertainment business

In 2012, he signed an all female group called D3 to his Lynx Entertainment record label. The group, released hit singles such as 'Good Girls Gone Bad' and 'Gyani Gyani' before splitting at the end of 2013 due to educational commitments of the young group members. The lead singer of the group, MzVee was subsequently signed to the record label as a solo artiste and went on to release three albums under the label, Reveelation in 2014, Verified in 2015, and DaaVee in 2017 to commercial and critical acclaim.

Richie is also a mentor on MTN's Hitmaker, Ghana's largest music talent show The show launched in 2012 is now in its ninth season.

He also has two of the hottest young afrobeats stars KiDi and Kuami Eugene signed to his label.

In January 2017, Richie was appointed Director of Music and Industry Standards by the Musicians Union of Ghana (MUSIGA) to work with MUSIGA's newly established Membership and Business Development Office and lead on their industry standardization efforts.

Discography
Albums

All of Me (2008)
UKNR (2010)

Singles

 Frema – 2007
 When I Get You (ft Asem) – 2008
 London (ft Adina) – 2009
 Intoxicated (ft Sway) – 2010
 Yaaro – 2010
 Asa Fofro (ft SK Blinkz) – 2010
 Changing Faces – 2012
 This is Love – 2012

Production discography (this includes the following)

 Adina – Why
 Adina – Araba album (produced 9 of the songs on the album)
 Afriyie (Wutah) – Love of My Life
 Asem – Give Me Blow
 Asem – Pigaro
 Asem – No More Kpayor
 Asem – Manager
 Asem – School Dey Be
 Asem ft Sway – Suuliya
 Asem – 2010 Fylla
 Asem ft VIP – Ebi Your Own
 Becca ft Samini – Fire
 Black Prophet ft Asem – Behave
 Bradez – Simple
 Chase – Finally
 Chase ft Efya – Give Me Your Heart
 D3 – Good Girls Gone Bad
 Dela ft Asem and Richie – Got Me Bound
 Eazzy – Bo Wonsem Mame
 Eazzy – Wengeze
 Eazzy ft Richie – One Gal
 Eazzy ft Jupitar – Gogo wind
 Echo ft Tinny – Golo Golo
 Efya – Little Things 
 Efya – Best in Me
 Irene – Runaway
 Irene – Kabilla
 Irene and Jane – Heated Up
 Lynx ft Asem, Tinny, Okyeame Kwame, Edem, 5Five – Swagger Like Us
 Lynx ft All Stars – Yen Ara Asaase Ni
 Lynx ft Asem, Richie, Zigi, Eazzy, Guru – Fire
 Jay Ghartey ft Tinny – Go Hard All Day
 KiDi – Say You Love Me (co-produced)
 KiDi – Say You Love Me skit
 KiDi – Thunder (co-produced)
 KiDi – For Better For Worse (co-produced)
 KiDi ft Adina – One Man
 Kuami Eugene – Boom Bang Bang (co-produced)
 Kuami Eugene – Ebeyeyie
 Kuami Eugene – Heaven
 Kuami Eugene – Rockstar
 Kuami Eugene – Son of Africa
 Kuami Eugene – Show Body
 Kuami Eugene ft Eddy Kenzo – Give It To Me
 Kwaku T – Kwaku Tutu
 Kwaw Kese ft Prof Jay – Who Be You
 Lady Prempeh ft Asem n Richie – Odo Yi Wohe
 Mimi ft 4x4 – Leave Me Alone
 MzVee ft VVIP – Borkor Borkor
 MzVee ft Stonebwoy – Natural Girl
 MzVee ft Shatta Wale – My Everything 
 MzVee ft Pappy Kojo – Mensuro Obia
 MzVee ft Efya – Abofra
 MzVee – Come and See My Moda
 Obour ft Okyeame Kwame n Richie – Killing The Game
 OJ Blaq ft Asem n 4x4 – Chale Wote
 OJ Blaq – Biggie Boy Lover
 Okyeame Kwame ft Richie Woso
 Praye – Wonkoa 
 Richie – Frema
 Richie – Yaaro
 Richie – Changes Faces
 Richie ft Asem – When I Get You
 Richie ft Adina – London
 Richie ft Sway – Intoxicated 
 Ruff and Smooth – Azingele
 Scientific – Africa Unite
 Shatta Wale ft MzVee – Dancehall Queen
 Stonebwoy – Can't Cool
 Stonebwoy ft MzVee – Come Over
 Tiffany – Fake London Boy
 Tinny – Incomplete 
 Tinny ft Asem, Richie, Okyeame Kwame – Ringtone
 Tinny ft Samini n 2Face – Now You Know
 VIP – I Think I Like Am
 Zigi – U Say Weytin
 Zigi ft Sonniballi – Amanda 
 Zigi ft Eazzy – Let's Get it Started

Awards and nominations

References

External links 
 

1986 births
Living people
Musicians from Accra
Ghanaian record producers
Alumni of Achimota School